Edwin Teague (born October 26, 1934) is an American former sports shooter. He competed in the 25 metre pistol event at the 1964 Summer Olympics.

References

1934 births
Living people
American male sport shooters
Olympic shooters of the United States
Shooters at the 1964 Summer Olympics
Sportspeople from Greensboro, North Carolina
Pan American Games medalists in shooting
Pan American Games bronze medalists for the United States
Shooters at the 1967 Pan American Games